The 1975 Virginia Cavaliers football team represented the University of Virginia during the 1975 NCAA Division I football season. The Cavaliers were led by second-year head coach Sonny Randle and played their home games at Scott Stadium in Charlottesville, Virginia. They competed as members of the Atlantic Coast Conference, finishing in last. After a 1–10 campaign with many blowout losses, Randle was fired as head coach.

Schedule

Personnel

References

Virginia
Virginia Cavaliers football seasons
Virginia Cavaliers football